Manikganj Government Women College is a government-owned higher secondary institution located in Shahid Rafique Sarak, Manikganj Sadar Upazila, Manikganj, Dhaka, Bangladesh. It was founded in 1972 to provide female education. It offers degrees and honors levels.

History 
The degree level was started in 1974 followed by the Higher Secondary School Certificate level in 1992. In 2011, the college started offering an honors level. It was nationalized in 1985.

Campus 
It stands on a 5.38 acre campus.

Library 
The college has a library housing over 7000 books.

Staff 
The current principal of the college is Professor Dr. Mahbubur Rahman. The Vice-principal is Professor Ranajit Kumar Sarkar.

Faculties and departments 
The college has one faculty.

Faculty of Arts and Social Science 
The faculty comprises five departments:

 Bangla
 English
 Islamic History and Culture
 Philosophy
 Political science

Degree (Pass) Courses 
 B.A. (Pass)

References 

1972 establishments in Bangladesh
Education in Dhaka